The Love Bandit is a 1924 American silent Western film with a Northwoods theme directed by Dell Henderson and starring Doris Kenyon, Victor Sutherland, and Cecil Spooner.

Plot
As described in a film magazine review, Amy Van Clayton is saved from drowning by Jim Blazes, whom she meets in a lumber camp. In New York City, Amy finds that her brother Fred Clayton is in danger of going to jail for robbing from his employer, who turns out to be Jim Blazes. Amy marries Jim to save her brother. Feeling that his wife does not love him, Jim returns to the lumber camp and is wounded in a gang fight. Amy is kidnapped and Jim gets into a vicious gun fight with Amy's kidnappers whom he later subdues. He saves Amy, who was tied to a buzzsaw table, from certain death. Now rescued, Amy finds happiness with her husband.

Cast

See also
 Blue Jeans (1917)
 The Ice Flood (1926)

Preservation
An abridged version of The Love Bandit survives with a private collector.

References

Bibliography
 Goble, Alan (1999). The Complete Index to Literary Sources in Film. Walter de Gruyter.

External links

Lobby card at www.gettyimages.com
Lobby card at The Limington Historical Society

1924 films
1924 Western (genre) films
Vitagraph Studios films
Films directed by Dell Henderson
American black-and-white films
Silent American Western (genre) films
1920s English-language films
1920s American films